In Greek mythology, the name Theobule ( from  +  'divine will' or 'divine counsel') refers to:
 
Theobule, mother of Myrtilus by Hermes.
Theobula, mother of Arcesilaus and Prothoenor by Areilycus (Archilycus). Their son was one of the Boeotian leaders in the Trojan War.  In one account, Alector was the father of Arcesilaus by Cleobule and Prothoenor by Arteis.

This name was also thought to have given rise to Sibyl by Varro, a Roman man of letters. The historian Jerome similarly explained Theobule as the Attic form of the Doric  (Siobolla), a variant of Sibulla (Sibyl in Greek)

Notes

References 

 Diodorus Siculus, The Library of History translated by Charles Henry Oldfather. Twelve volumes. Loeb Classical Library. Cambridge, Massachusetts: Harvard University Press; London: William Heinemann, Ltd. 1989. Vol. 3. Books 4.59–8. Online version at Bill Thayer's Web Site Diodorus Siculus, Bibliotheca Historica. Vol 1-2. Immanel Bekker. Ludwig Dindorf. Friedrich Vogel. in aedibus B. G. Teubneri. Leipzig. 1888-1890. Greek text available at the Perseus Digital Library.
Gaius Julius Hyginus, Fabulae from The Myths of Hyginus translated and edited by Mary Grant. University of Kansas Publications in Humanistic Studies. Online version at the Topos Text Project.
Homer, The Iliad with an English Translation by A.T. Murray, Ph.D. in two volumes. Cambridge, MA., Harvard University Press; London, William Heinemann, Ltd. 1924. . Online version at the Perseus Digital Library.
Homer, Homeri Opera in five volumes. Oxford, Oxford University Press. 1920. . Greek text available at the Perseus Digital Library.
Tzetzes, John, Allegories of the Iliad translated by Goldwyn, Adam J. and Kokkini, Dimitra. Dumbarton Oaks Medieval Library, Harvard University Press, 2015. 

Women of Hermes
Mortal parents of demigods in classical mythology
Women in Greek mythology
Boeotian characters in Greek mythology